James Aitchison Johnston Hunter (4 July 1882 – 27 October 1968) was an Australian politician.

Hunter was born at Springburn, near Glasgow, Scotland and migrated with his family to Brisbane in 1884 educated there. He joined the state public service and became an accountant in the Queensland Railways. In 1908, he married Florence Phoebe Nason, who came from a family of pastoralists established near Surat. She predeceased him in 1960 aged 76.  In 1912, he set up as a public accountant at Dalby.

Hunter won the Australian House of Representatives seat of Maranoa at a 1921 by-election. In November 1934 he was appointed a minister without portfolio in the third Lyons ministry. He was not reappointed to the ministry after the November 1937 election. In 1936, he cofounded the Queensland Country Party, which replaced the Country and Progressive National Party in Queensland. He retired from parliament ahead of the November 1940 election.

Hunter died at a retirement home in the Brisbane suburb of Sandgate and was buried in Toowong Cemetery. He was survived by his two sons.

Notes

External links
Hunter James Aitchinson Johnston — Brisbane City Council Grave Location Search

National Party of Australia members of the Parliament of Australia
Members of the Australian House of Representatives
Members of the Australian House of Representatives for Maranoa
Members of the Cabinet of Australia
1882 births
1968 deaths
Burials at Toowong Cemetery
20th-century Australian politicians
Scottish emigrants to colonial Australia
Politicians from Brisbane
People from Springburn